The peripharyngeal space is a space in the neck.

It can be split into the retropharyngeal space and the parapharyngeal space.

References

Human head and neck